O'Sullivan Dam (National ID # WA00268), one of the largest earthfill dams in the United States (200 ft/61 m high; 19,000 ft/5,791 m long; completed 1949), is on Crab Creek in the U.S. state of Washington, about 45 km south of Ephrata and 25 km south of Moses Lake.

The  Potholes Reservoir formed by this dam collects return flows from all irrigation in the upper portion of the project for reuse in the southern portion. A system of wasteways has been built on both the West and East Low Canals to provide operational safety for the canals and a means of delivering water into Potholes Reservoir to supplement the natural and return flows.

The dam was built as part of the Columbia Basin Project.

Statistics 
Active storage capacity: 
Structural height of dam: 200.0 ft (60 m)
Construction date: 1947-1949
Normal water surface elevation: 1052.0 ft (320.6 m)
Drainage area: 3,920.0 sq mi (10,153 km²)
Storm duration: 72 hr

See also
Columbia Basin Project

External links
 O'Sullivan Dam

Dams in Washington (state)
Buildings and structures in Grant County, Washington
Dams completed in 1949
United States Bureau of Reclamation dams